The Sachsenring is a motorsport racing circuit located in Hohenstein-Ernstthal near Chemnitz in Saxony, Germany. Among other events, it features the annual German motorcycle Grand Prix of the FIM Grand Prix motorcycle racing world championship.

History 

The first race was held on 26 May 1927 on an  layout on public roads, running also through the village of Hohenstein-Ernstthal itself. It was dubbed "Sachsenring" in 1937.

The East German motorcycle Grand Prix was held there from 1961 to 1972. The local two stroke MZ bikes of Zschopau were competitive during this time. The quickest lap was achieved by 15 time World Champion Giacomo Agostini on a MV Agusta with a  average. After West German Dieter Braun won in 1971 and the East German fans sang the West German National Anthem in celebration (as is the case in sport, the winner's National Anthem is played after the event), the event was limited to East European entrants for political reasons.

In 1990, with faster Western machinery now available, racing through the village became too dangerous with some fatalities (this can be compared with the Isle of Man TT).

To accelerate redevelopment of eastern Germany in the new unified Germany, a  short track berg corner was built in the 1990s to bring international motorsport to the eastern part of Germany. In 1996, IDM motorcycle racing and the ADAC Super Tourenwagen Cup resumed racing here. The DTM raced here in 2000, with Klaus Ludwig winning at age 51, but the DTM did not return after 2002, preferring international venues. DTM will return to Sachsenring in 2023 after its take-over by ADAC due to its preference of using national venues again.

Since 1998, the German motorcycle Grand Prix moved to the Sachsenring from Nürburgring. In recent years, the track has been made faster and longer again, with the length now being . Since 2007, the Sachsenring is part of the regular schedule of ADAC GT Masters. In 2011 the FIA GT1 World Championship held one of its race weekends at the Sachsenring.

Layout history

Most wins

Grand Prix motorcycle racing

*German motorcycle Grand Prix was not held in 2020.

Lap records

The fastest official race lap records at the Sachsenring are listed as:

Events

 Current

 May: Sidecar World Championship, IDM Superbike Championship
 June: Grand Prix motorcycle racing German motorcycle Grand Prix, MotoE German eRace
 August:  – based in Germany, this low-budget one-make amateur racing series for un-, up to mildly tuned MZ Skorpions celebrated its 25th jubilee in 2021. From 2023 on it also opened up for off ranking guest participations of other selected Supermono bikes.
 September: Deutsche Tourenwagen Masters, ADAC GT Masters, Porsche Carrera Cup Germany

 Former

 ADAC Formula 4 (2015–2017, 2019, 2021)
 FIA ETCR (2022)
 German Formula Three Championship (1997–2002, 2004–2005, 2007–2014)
 Grand Prix motorcycle racing East German motorcycle Grand Prix (1961–1972)
 FIA GT1 World Championship (2011)
 Super Tourenwagen Cup (1996–1999)
 V8Star Series (2003)

Spectators at the MotoGP since 1998

References

Bibliography 
 Wolfgang Hallmann: Das war der Sachsenring – Geschichte und Gegenwart einer legendären Rennstrecke; Chemnitzer Verlag, Chemnitz; 1996;

External links 

 Traffic safety center Sachsenring site (German page)
 Official website
 Map and history of Sachsenring at RacingCircuits.info
 Satellite View of Sachsenring from Google Maps

Motorsport venues in Saxony
Grand Prix motorcycle circuits
Hohenstein-Ernstthal
Sports venues in Saxony